Kardgar Kola may refer to:
 Kardgar Kola, Babol
 Kardgar Kola, Nur